Gustavo Rivera (born November 19, 1975) is a New York state senator representing the 33rd Senate District, covering the Bronx neighborhoods of Kingsbridge Heights, Kingsbridge, Fordham, University Heights, Van Nest, Tremont, East Tremont, and parts of Morrisania and Parkchester. First elected in 2010, Rivera is a Democrat.

Background 
Rivera was born and raised in Santurce, San Juan, Puerto Rico. He received a B.A. in political science from the University of Puerto Rico in May 1998. Following graduation, Rivera moved to New York to begin a doctoral program in political science at the Graduate Center of the City University of New York. He taught courses at Hunter College until 2002, and served as an Assistant Professor of Political Science at Pace University until his first election in 2010.

Rivera has served in politics by serving as campaign manager for politicians such as Phil Reed and his future colleagues Jose M. Serrano and Andrea Stewart-Cousins.

In September 2010, he was named one of City Hall's "40 under 40" for being a young influential member of New York City politics.

As of 2011, Rivera was single and resided in University Heights.

New York Senate 
After serving as Director of Outreach under United States Senator Kirsten Gillibrand, Rivera decided to run for the New York State Senate in 2010. The incumbent, Senator Pedro Espada Jr., had long been a staple in Bronx politics. Espada was considered the favorite throughout the election. After a hard fought campaign, Rivera ultimately defeated Espada in the Democratic primary. Espada would later be convicted of embezzlement.

In the Senate, Rivera is known as a leading progressive voice. With the Democrats retaking the majority in 2018, Rivera was named Chair of the Senate Health Committee. Rivera has advocated for single-payer health insurance. Rivera is notably in opposition to legislation which seeks to curtail the influence of the Boycott Divest Sanction movement in New York.

References

External links
Official Senate Website

1975 births
American politicians of Puerto Rican descent
Living people
People from Santurce, Puerto Rico
Puerto Rican people in New York (state) politics
Democratic Party New York (state) state senators
University of Puerto Rico alumni
Graduate Center, CUNY alumni
21st-century American politicians
Politicians from the Bronx
Hunter College faculty
Hispanic and Latino American state legislators in New York (state)